Paula Deubel (June 24, 1935 – August 21, 1993) was an American athlete. She competed in the women's shot put at the 1956 Summer Olympics.

References

1935 births
1993 deaths
Athletes (track and field) at the 1956 Summer Olympics
American female shot putters
Olympic track and field athletes of the United States
Place of birth missing
20th-century American women